Added value in financial analysis of shares is to be distinguished from value added. It is used as a measure of shareholder value, calculated using the formula:

Added Value = The selling price of a product - the cost of bought-in materials and components

Added Value can also be defined as the difference between a particular product's final selling price and the direct and indirect input used in making that particular product. Also it can be said to be the process of increasing the perceived value of the product in the eyes of the consumers (formally known as the value proposition).

The difference is profit for the firm and its shareholders after all the costs and taxes owed by the business have been paid for that financial year. Value added or any related measure may help investors decide if this is a business that is worthwhile investing on, or that there are other and better opportunities (fixed deposits, debentures).

Example 
A jewelry business could display products in an attractive display or offer a gift wrapping service. These changes could make customers more willing to pay a higher price for products that appear to be of higher quality.

Other consultancy measures 

For other consultancy measures for shareholder value, see

Economic value added
Market value added

References

Kay, J. (1993) Foundations of Corporate Success, Oxford: Oxford University Press.

Financial economics
Corporate development